The 2000 New Mexico Lobos football team represented the University of New Mexico during the 2000 NCAA Division I-A football season. New Mexico competed as a member of the Mountain West Conference (MW), and played their home games in the University Stadium. The Lobos were led by third-year head coach Rocky Long.

Schedule

Game summaries

Oregon State

2001 NFL Draft

References

New Mexico
New Mexico Lobos football seasons
New Mexico Lobos football